The Riverman is a 2004 American biographical crime drama television film directed by Bill Eagles and written by Tom Towler, based on the 2004 non-fiction book The Riverman: Ted Bundy and I Hunt for the Green River Killer by Robert D. Keppel and William J. Birnes. Shot in Halifax, Canada, the film stars Bruce Greenwood, Sam Jaeger, Kathleen Quinlan, and Cary Elwes. It premiered on A&E on September 6, 2004. The film follows real life incidents around how convicted  infamous serial killer Ted Bundy helps detectives Robert D. Keppel and Dave Reichert by providing insights into the mind of a psychopath killer to catch then active murderer Green River Killer aka Gary Ridgway.

Plot
Robert D. Keppel, a criminology professor at the University of Washington, is approached by Detective Dave Reichert to help profile a serial killer preying on prostitutes in the Seattle, Washington area. Keppel agrees over the objections of his wife Sande, who is tired of him spending more time with crime scene investigations than with her.

Keppel receives a letter from serial killer Ted Bundy, whom Keppel had helped send to death row, offering to "consult" on the case. Keppel conducts a series of interviews with Bundy under the guise of wanting his expertise. In reality, he is hoping that Bundy will reveal details of his own murders before he is executed. Bundy is little help in profiling the killer, whom he dubs "The Riverman", but he does shed light on his own pathology, particularly his need to "possess" his victims, even to the point of necrophilia. Finally, Bundy confesses to several unsolved murders in the vain hope that Keppel will delay his execution.

Meanwhile, Keppel and Reichert question a suspect, Gary Ridgway, and take a DNA sample. Years later, the DNA is used to convict Ridgway of the murders.

Cast
 Bruce Greenwood as Robert D. Keppel
 Sam Jaeger as Dave Reichert
 Kathleen Quinlan as Sande Keppel
 Cary Elwes as Ted Bundy
 Dave Brown as Gary Ridgway
 Sarah Manninen as Georgeann Hawkins

References

External links
 

2004 television films
2004 films
2004 biographical drama films
2004 crime drama films
2004 crime thriller films
2004 thriller drama films
2000s American films
2000s English-language films
2000s serial killer films
A&E (TV network) original films
American biographical drama films
American crime drama films
American crime thriller films
American drama television films
American serial killer films
American thriller drama films
American thriller television films
Biographical films about serial killers
Biographical television films
Crime television films
Films about Ted Bundy
Films based on non-fiction books
Films directed by Bill Eagles
Films scored by Jeff Rona
Films set in Seattle
Films shot in Halifax, Nova Scotia
Television films based on books
Thriller films based on actual events